Lloyd E. Lewis Jr. was a former member of the Ohio House of Representatives. A native of Dayton, Lewis served as a former assistant city manager for Dayton and as a member of the city plan board.  He also once was a general manager for Rike's downtown, and served as DP&L's assistant vice president for community relations, recruiting and customer relations. He was married to Edythe Lewis.

References

Democratic Party members of the Ohio House of Representatives
1926 births
2001 deaths
20th-century American politicians
Politicians from Xenia, Ohio